Merry Christmas Wherever You Are is the second Christmas album by George Strait.  It was released by MCA Records. It has his versions of many classic Christmas songs, as well as the newly penned tracks "I Know What I Want for Christmas", "Old Time Christmas", "Noel Leon", "Santa's on His Way" and the title track.

Track listing

Personnel
Eddie Bayers – drums
Lisa Cochran – background vocals
Travis Cottrell – background vocals
Jim Cox – keyboards, piano
Eric Darken – percussion
Tim Davis – background vocals
Larry Franklin – fiddle
Paul Franklin – pedal steel guitar
Steve Gibson – acoustic guitar
Stephanie Hall – background vocals
Wes Hightower – background vocals
Jon Mark Ivey – background vocals
Marabeth Jordon – background vocals
Liana Manis – background vocals
Steve Nathan – keyboards, piano, Hammond organ
Dean Parks – electric guitar
Lisa Silver – background vocals
George Strait – lead vocals
Dennis Wilson – background vocals
Glenn Worf – bass guitar, upright bass

Strings by The Nashville String Machine, arranged and conducted by Russell Mauldin

Chart positions

References

1999 Christmas albums
George Strait albums
MCA Records albums
Albums produced by Tony Brown (record producer)
Christmas albums by American artists
Country Christmas albums